The Prostitution Reform Act 2003 is an Act of Parliament that decriminalised prostitution in New Zealand. The act also gave new rights to sex workers. It has attracted international attention, although its reception has been mixed. The Act repealed the Massage Parlours Act 1978 and the associated regulations.

Purpose of Act
Section 3 of the Act defines its purpose:

See also
Prostitution in New Zealand
Culture of New Zealand

References

External links
Prostitution Reform Act 2003 - text of the Act

Prostitution law in New Zealand
Statutes of New Zealand
2003 in New Zealand law